Bidens radiata is a species of flowering plant belonging to the family Asteraceae.

Its native range is Europe to Russian Far East and Korea.

References

radiata